The Great George Street Waltz was written by George Brothers, who named the song after a street in Charlottetown, Prince Edward Island.

Recordings
 "The Fiddle Music of Western Prince Edward Island", Rounder CD 7014 (Brothers accompanies fiddlers Peter Doiron & Adam Driscol on his guitar on this recording) 
 "Let's Do Something", Bill Evans and Megan Lynch, Native and Fine Records 906-8

External links
 The Prince Edward Island Style of Fiddling

Waltzes
North American folk music
Canadian folk songs
Prince Edward Island music
Year of song missing